The Twofold Bay Magnet and South Coast and Southern Monaro Advertiser was an English language newspaper published in Monaro, New South Wales, Australia.

Newspaper history 
The Twofold Bay Magnet and South Coast and Southern Monaro Advertiser was first published on 5 June 1908. The first edition's editorial declared  One issue of great concern to the proprietors was the construction of a railway from Bega to Eden. Above all, the editors declared democracy to be the paper's overriding policy.

The proprietors of the newspaper were determined to set The Twofold Bay Magnet and South Coast and Southern Monaro Advertiser apart from other country newspapers with the introduction of illustrated matter "depicting the beauty-spots of our district". The paper moved to aggressively promote the local tourism industry based in and around the areas of Eden and Southern Monaro that had otherwise been overlooked.

A firm commitment to quality news reportage was made through special arrangements for a prompt and concise national and international telegraphic service and the employment of a number of correspondents who were appointed throughout the electorate. All shipping and commercial notes were to be specialised. Of particular importance to the newspaper were "all matters that affect the mining, pastoral and agricultural industries".

The Twofold Bay Magnet and South Coast and Southern Monaro Advertiser ceased publication on 17 May 1919 and was continued by The Eden Magnet and South Eastern Advocate and Advertiser published from 1919 to 1940.

Digitisation 
The Twofold Bay Magnet and South Coast and Southern Monaro Advertiser has been digitised as part of the Australian Newspapers Digitisation Program of the National Library of Australia.

See also 
 List of newspapers in New South Wales
 List of newspapers in Australia

References

External links 
 

Defunct newspapers published in New South Wales
Publications established in 1908
Publications disestablished in 1919
Newspapers on Trove